Pherá, also spelled Xwela, is a Gbe language of Benin. It forms a dialect chain with Western Phla.

References

Gbe languages
Languages of Benin